Inga platyptera is a species of plant in the family Fabaceae. The plant is endemic to the Atlantic Forest ecoregion in southeastern Brazil. It is an IUCN Red List Endangered species.

References

platyptera
Endemic flora of Brazil
Flora of the Atlantic Forest
Endangered plants
Endangered biota of South America
Taxa named by George Bentham
Taxonomy articles created by Polbot